Global distillation or the grasshopper effect is the geochemical process by which certain chemicals, most notably persistent organic pollutants (POPs), are transported from warmer to colder regions of the Earth, particularly the poles and mountain tops. Global distillation explains why relatively high concentrations of POPs have been found in the Arctic environment and in the bodies of animals and people who live there, even though most of the chemicals have not been used in the region in appreciable amounts.

Mechanism
The global distillation process can be understood using the same principles that explain distillations used to make liquor or purify chemicals in a laboratory. In these processes, a substance is vapourised at a relatively high temperature, and then the vapour travels to an area of lower temperature where it condenses. A similar phenomenon occurs on a global scale for certain chemicals. When these chemicals are released into the environment, some evaporates when ambient temperatures are warm,  blows around on winds until temperatures are cooler, and then condensation occurs. Drops in temperature large enough to result in deposition can occur when chemicals are blown from warmer to cooler climates, or when seasons change.  The net effect is atmospheric transport from low to high latitude and altitude. Since global distillation is a relatively slow process that relies on successive evaporation/condensation cycles, it is only effective for semi-volatile chemicals that break down very slowly in the environment, like DDT, polychlorinated biphenyls, and lindane.

Effect of global distillation
Several studies have measured the effect, usually by correlating the concentrations of a certain chemical in air, water, or biological specimens from various parts of the world with the latitude from which the samples were collected. For example, the levels of PCBs, hexachlorobenzene, and lindane measured in water, lichens, and tree bark have been shown to be greater in higher latitudes. 

The effect is also used to explain why certain pesticides are found in Arctic and high altitude samples even though there is no agricultural activity in these areas, and why indigenous peoples of the Arctic have some of the highest body burdens of certain POPs ever measured. Recent studies conclude that for most pollutants slower degradation in colder temperatures is a more important factor in accounting for their accumulation in cold region than global distillation. Exceptions include highly volatile, persistent substances such as chlorofluorocarbons.

See also

 Stockholm Convention

References

Further reading

External links
The Grasshopper Effect and Tracking Hazardous Air Pollutants, Environment Canada.

Global environmental issues
Environmental effects of pesticides
Environment of the Arctic
Pollution
Air pollution